Untold Truths is the debut country album from actor-turned-singer Kevin Costner & Modern West. The album was released on November 11, 2008 (see 2008 in country music) on Universal South Records. The album reached #61 on the U.S. Billboard Top Country Albums, and #35 on the U.S. Top Heatseekers charts.

Three singles, "Superman 14", "Long Hot Night", and "Backyard" have been released to radio, although none of the songs entered the Hot Country Songs charts.

Track listing

Chart performance

Album

Singles

References

2008 debut albums
Kevin Costner albums
Show Dog-Universal Music albums